Francis Williamson (13 October 1822 - 26 November 1883) was a British surveyor and architect based in Nottingham.

History
He was born on 13 October 1822 in Lowdham, Nottinghamshire, the son of William Williamson and Maria. He established himself in practice in Bottle Lane, Nottingham around 1848.

He married Anne Coulby on 22 May 1851 at St John’s Church, Carrington.

He died on 26 November 1883 and left an estate valued at £7,247 11s 1d.

Works
Parsonage House, St. John the Baptist's Church, Leenside, Nottingham Station Road/London Road, Nottingham 1850-51 (demolished ca. 1899)
Villa with outbuildings, Forest Grove, Nottingham 1851
House, stable and outbuildings, Sneinton, 1852
2-20, Annesley Grove, Nottingham (for the Nottingham Freeholders’ Permanent Benefit Building Society) 1854
Wilford School, Nottingham 1865-66 rebuilding
Warehouse, Spaniel Row/Houndsgate 1874 
New School, Clifton, Nottingham 1871-72
Pratt, Hurst and Company warehouse, Hollowstone, Nottingham 1873
Warehouse, Spaniel Row/Houndsgate 1874 
Pair of shops 4 Bridlesmith Gate (also 13 Poultry, Nottingham) 1875

References

1822 births
1883 deaths
19th-century English architects
Architects from Nottingham